Savage  is a suburban city  south-southwest of downtown Minneapolis in Scott County in the U.S. state of Minnesota. The city is on the south bank of the Minnesota River in a region commonly called South of the River, comprising the southern portion of Minneapolis-St. Paul, the 16th-largest metropolitan area in the United States. The population of Savage was 32,465 at the 2020 census.

Minnesota State Highway 13 and County Road 42 are two of the main routes in Savage. Interstate 35W and U.S. Highway 169 are in close proximity to the city.

The landing point for Irish and Scottish immigrants in 1800, Savage has grown into a developing bedroom community, absorbing population growth from Burnsville, its larger neighbor to the east. Once a shipbuilding port for the U.S. Navy, Savage is now an industrial manufacturing job center in the southern metro. The city is still relatively undeveloped, with sections of the Minnesota Valley National Wildlife Refuge and Murphy-Hanrehan Park Reserve within its borders.

Previously named Hamilton after the city in Ontario, Canada, the town was renamed Savage after Marion Willis Savage, who owned and trained the nationally celebrated racing horse Dan Patch.

History
In the 17th century, French fur traders and explorers explored the Minnesota River valley. After 1750, Mdewakanton Dakota then settled at Chief Black Dog's camp—near what is now Black Dog Lake in Burnsville. Dakota used the Minnesota River valley region including present-day Savage for fish, game, boating and camping.

In 1852, traders established a small post at the confluence of the Credit River and the Minnesota River. William Byrne, who immigrated from County Kilkenny, Ireland, to Hamilton, Ontario, Canada, in 1840, arrived in the area shortly after, via steamboat from Fort Snelling. Already established in business and trade, he and other Irish and Scottish settlers built Hamilton Landing, a port for boats, named after the city he immigrated to in Canada. The town incorporated in 1892 as the village of Hamilton. Byrne later settled another nearby area which became Burnsville.

The Chicago & North Western (present day Union Pacific Railroad) railway line reached the site in 1865, and in 1866 the town gained a post office. Hamilton became the crossroads of trade and service in the region with the Credit River, Minnesota River, the valley's wagon and road trails, and the rail line.

The post office was later renamed Glendale Post Station in 1894 and formed Glendale Township to the west of Hamilton, but was later consolidated with Savage in 1969. The roughly 17 blocks of the late 19th-century town remain as Savage's downtown along Highway 13 (Minnesota).

In 1902, Minneapolis entrepreneur Marion Willis Savage purchased racing horse Dan Patch and trained and raced him at his farm in the limits of Hamilton. Dan Patch's notoriety grew as the horse began breaking speed records, and with it grew the town's prestige. In 1904 the townspeople renamed the community after Savage with the post office officially confirming. In 1906 at the Minnesota State Fair, Dan Patch broke the world pacing mile record at 1 minute and 55 seconds, a record that remained unsurpassed for 54 years.

During World War II, Savage was home to Camp Savage, a Military Intelligence School (MIS) language program, which taught Japanese to American military personnel. Established in 1942, the school trained with niseis and improved military intelligence of the time. It was later relocated to Fort Snelling and is commemorated at Normandale College's Japanese garden. At about the same time, Cargill, Incorporated, began building ships for the U.S. Navy at the newly constructed Meadowland Shipyard, renamed Port Cargill (former site of Hamilton Landing). About 3,500 people were employed during peak production resulting in 18 auxiliary oil and gas carriers and 4 tugboats constructed. After World War II the port began shipping agricultural commodities.

Savage remained undeveloped in the postwar housing boom, isolated by the Minnesota River and without a direct interstate connection. Lack of available construction materials in the immediate area also prevented development. By the 1980s, with the upgrade of Highway 13 and construction of the Highway 169 Bloomington Ferry Bridge in 1996 across the Minnesota River, Savage finally boomed as one of the growing exurbs with low-cost greenfield land in the metropolitan area. The citizens of Savage reclaimed some of their history in the early 21st century, when it relocated the displaced Savage Depot built in 1880 by the then Chicago, Minneapolis and Omaha Rail Road.

Geography
The city's northern boundary is the Minnesota River; its tributary the Credit River flows northward through the city.

Demographics

2010 census
As of the census of 2010, there were 26,911 people, 9,116 households, and 7,222 families living in the city. The racial makeup of the city was 82.6% White, 4.3% African American, 0.4% Native American, 8.4% Asian, 0.3% Pacific Islander, 1.4% from other races, and 2.6% from two or more races. Hispanic or Latino of any race were 3.4% of the population."

There were 9,116 households, of which 47.6% had children under the age of 18 living with them, 66.3% were married couples living together, 8.2% had a female householder with no husband present, 4.7% had a male householder with no wife present, and 20.8% were non-families. 14.8% of all households were made up of individuals, and 3.2% had someone living alone who was 65 years of age or older. The average household size was 2.95 and the average family size was 3.31.

The median age in the city was 34.6 years. 31.5% of residents were under the age of 18; 6.1% were between the ages of 18 and 24; 30.8% were from 25 to 44; 26.1% were from 45 to 64; and 5.5% were 65 years of age or older. The gender makeup of the city was 50.1% male and 49.9% female.

2000 census
As of the census of 2000, there were 21,115 people, 6,807 households, and 5,717 families living in the city. The racial makeup of the city was 90.65% White, 1.59% African American, 0.25% Native American, 5.39% Asian, 0.02% Pacific Islander, 0.66% from other races, and 1.45% from two or more races. Hispanic or Latino of any race were 1.63% of the population.

There were 6,807 households, out of which 56.4% had children under the age of 18 living with them, 74.0% were married couples living together, 6.6% had a female householder with no husband present, and 16.0% were non-families. 11.1% of all households were made up of individuals, and 1.7% had someone living alone who was 65 years of age or older.  The average household size was 3.10 and the average family size was 3.38.

In the city, the population was spread out, with 35.6% under the age of 18, 4.5% from 18 to 24, 43.5% from 25 to 44, 13.7% from 45 to 64, and 2.6% who were 65 years of age or older.  The median age was 31 years. For every 100 females, there were 103.6 males.  For every 100 females age 18 and over, there were 101.2 males.

The median income for a household in the city was $75,097, and the median income for a family was $79,244 (these figures had risen to $92,571 and $99,814 respectively as of a 2007 estimate). Males had a median income of $50,884 versus $35,824 for females. The per capita income for the city was $26,858.  About 1.9% of families and 2.3% of the population were below the poverty line, including 2.4% of those under age 18 and 3.0% of those age 65 or over.

Schools
Three school districts serve the city of Savage:

 Prior Lake-Savage District 719
 Burnsville-Eagan-Savage District 191
 Shakopee School District 720

A portion of Savage is in the Bloomington School District, but no households are in this area.

Students of the schools in the Prior Lake-Savage District that are in Savage (Redtail Ridge Elementary School and Glendale Elementary School) go on to Prior Lake High School.

Students of the schools in the Burnsville-Eagan-Savage School District that are in Savage (Harriet Bishop Elementary School, M.W. Savage Elementary School, Hidden Valley Elementary School, and Eagle Ridge Middle School) go on to Burnsville High School.

Government and politics
The current mayor is Janet Williams, and the city's four city council members are Gene Abbott, Matthew Johnson, Bob Coughlan, and Christine Kelly.

Savage is in Minnesota's 2nd congressional district, represented by Angie Craig, a Democrat. The city is in Minnesota Legislative District 56A, represented in the Minnesota House of Representatives by Jessica Hanson and in the Minnesota Senate by Lindsey Port.

References

External links
 Savage – City website
 Prior Lake-Savage School District Website
 Burnsville, Eagan, Savage School District Website
 Savage Pacer

Cities in Scott County, Minnesota
Cities in Minnesota